Karin Neugebauer (later Fröbel, born 5 December 1955 in Leipzig) is a retired German freestyle swimmer. At the age of 13 she won the gold medal in the 800 m freestyle event at the 1969 Junior European Aquatics Championships in Vienna, and repeated this achievement in the next year at the 1970 European Aquatics Championships. However, shortly thereafter she retired from competitive swimming.

References

1955 births
Living people
German female freestyle swimmers
Swimmers from Leipzig
European Aquatics Championships medalists in swimming
20th-century German women
21st-century German women